Elinah Phillip (born 3 April 2000) is a British Virgin Islander swimmer. She competed in the women's 50 metre freestyle event at the 2016 Summer Olympics. The first Olympic swimmer to represent the British Virgin Islands, Phillip ranked 48th with a time of 26.26 seconds. She did not advance to the semifinals.

She competed at the 2020 Summer Olympics.

References

2000 births
Living people
British Virgin Islands female swimmers
Olympic swimmers of the British Virgin Islands
Swimmers at the 2016 Summer Olympics
Place of birth missing (living people)
Swimmers at the 2015 Pan American Games
Swimmers at the 2018 Summer Youth Olympics
British Virgin Islands female freestyle swimmers
Pan American Games competitors for the British Virgin Islands
Swimmers at the 2020 Summer Olympics
FIU Panthers women's swimmers
Rutgers Scarlet Knights women's swimmers